is a Japanese professional skateboarder. He won the gold medal in the inaugural Olympic men's street event at the 2020 Summer Olympics, becoming the first person ever to win a gold medal in skateboarding at the Olympics.

Personal life
Horigome was born in Tokyo, Japan, and has two younger brothers. He began skating at Tokyo's Amazing Square Murasaki Skatepark when he was seven years old. He learned to skate from his father, who is a former Vert skateboarder. At age 14, Horigome began traveling to the United States for skating trips and eventually moved to Los Angeles, California, where he currently resides. He has competed in numerous American skateboarding pro tours, such as the Tampa Am and Dew Tour, as well as participating in filming parts.

Professional skateboarding

Career
Horigome was sponsored by a Japanese board company early on. In 2015, he entered the Wild In The Parks skate contest in Los Angeles, hosted by Volcom and The Berrics, where he finished 2nd. While in Los Angeles, he filmed some skating parts alongside Canadian skateboarder Micky Papa, who was sponsored by Blind Skateboards. Horigome joined the Blind Skateboards team later that year and stayed with the team until January 2019. In May 2019, Horigome joined April Skateboards, owned by pro skater Shane O'Neill, who turned Horigome pro.

World Skateboarding Ranking
Horigome ranked second in men's street on the World Skate (WS) World Skateboarding Olympic Rankings in June 2019, with 62,480 points. At that time, American Nyjah Huston topped the men's street rankings with 67,080 points. 

As the 2020 Olympic Games were postponed for a year and the number of skateboarding events in 2020 was significantly reduced due to the COVID-19 pandemic, the WS Olympic Rankings for June 2021 included points earned from events in the 1 January–30 September 2019 season and the 1 October 2019–30 June 2021 season. In the June 2021 men's rankings, Horigome remained in second place, with 249,200 points, behind Huston's 269,900 points.

Sponsorships
As of August 2022, Horigome is sponsored by Nike SB, April Skateboards, Hardies Hardware, Venture, Spitfire, Mixi, Murasaki, Rakuten, Lipovitan.

Personal honours
Horigome was named "Skater of the Year" at the Japan Action Sports Awards in 2017 and 2018.

Contest history
This list contains top pro tour, 5-star, and world championship events in which Horigome has participated; it is not an exhaustive list.

Videography
 2017: For Days - Blind
 2019: April Skateboards Pro Part - Nike SB

References

External links 
 
 Yuto Horigome at Skatepark of Tampa (SPoT)
 Yuto Horigome at The Boardr
 

Living people
1999 births
Japanese skateboarders
X Games athletes
Skateboarders at the 2020 Summer Olympics
Olympic gold medalists for Japan
Olympic medalists in skateboarding
Olympic skateboarders of Japan
Medalists at the 2020 Summer Olympics
World Skateboarding Championship medalists
20th-century Japanese people
21st-century Japanese people